Parliamentary elections were held in the Kingdom of Dalmatia in 1867. The Autonomists claimed victory for the third straight time, while the opposition People's Party narrowed the gap.

Results

Elections in Croatia
Dalmatia
1867 in Croatia
Elections in Austria-Hungary
History of Dalmatia
Election and referendum articles with incomplete results